Charles McNeill Gray (June 13, 1807 – October 17, 1885) served as Mayor of Chicago, Illinois (1853–1854) for the Democratic Party.

Biography
Charles McNeill Gray was born in Sherburne, New York on June 13, 1807. He arrived in Chicago on July 17, 1834, and took a job as a clerk for Gurdon Saltonstall Hubbard, later working for Peter Cohen, a retail merchant.  By 1844 he was a candle maker with his own shop.  He subsequently worked as a manufacturer, contractor and railroad man. He was elected mayor in 1853.

He died at his home in Chicago on October 17, 1885, and was buried at Graceland Cemetery.

References

External links
Inaugural Address 
Charles McNeill Gray at Chicago public library 
Gray, Charles McNeill, 12th Mayor of Chicago (1807-1885) at The Political Graveyard

1807 births
1885 deaths
Burials at Graceland Cemetery (Chicago)
Mayors of Chicago
19th-century American politicians